The archeology in Algeria is rich in prehistoric memorials of human occupation. Algeria contains many Roman remains and is  rich in monuments of Saracenic art.

Megalithic remains
Algeria has many megalithic remains, of which nearly every known kind has been found in the country. Numerous flints of palaeolithic type have been discovered, notably at Tlemcen and Kolea. Near Djelfa, in the Great Atlas, and at Mechra-Sfa ("ford of the flat stones"), a peninsula in the valley of the river Mina not far from Tiaret, are vast numbers of megalithic monuments.

Notable among the prehistoric cultures of the area is the Capsian culture, whose shell-mounds are found throughout the north.

Famous sites

Madghacen

Madghacen is a monument similar to the Qabr-er-Rumia, but older. The form is that of a truncated cone, placed on a cylindrical base,  in diameter. The columns encircling the cylindrical portion are stunted and much broader at the base than the top; the capitals are Doric. Many of the columns, 60 in number, have been much damaged. When the sepulchral chamber was opened in 1873 by Bauchetet, a French engineer officer, clear evidence was found that at some remote period the tomb had been rifled and an attempt made to destroy it by fire.

Qabr-er-Rumia

The Qabr-er-Rumia-- best known by its French name, Tombeau de la Chrétienne (grave of the Christian lady), tradition making it the burial-place of Florinda, la Cava Rumía, the beautiful and unfortunate daughter of Count Julian—is near Kolea, and is known to be the tomb of the Mauretanian king Juba II and of his wife Cleopatra Selene, daughter of Mark Antony and Cleopatra, queen of Egypt. A circular stone building surmounted by a pyramid rests on a lower platform,  square.

Its height is now : the cylindrical portion , the pyramid   The base,  in diameter, is ornamented with 60 engaged Ionic columns. The capitals of the columns have disappeared, but their design is preserved among the drawings of James Bruce, the African traveller.

The sepulchral chambers are separated by a short passage, and are cut off from the gallery by stone doors made of a single slab which can be moved up and down by levers, like a portcullis. The other chamber is somewhat smaller.

The tomb was previously looted, probably in search of treasure.  In 1555, Salah Rais, pasha of Algiers, set men to work to pull it down, but the records say that the attempt was given up because big black wasps came from under the stones and stung them to death. At the end of the 18th century, Baba Mahommed tried in vain to batter down the tomb with artillery.  In 1866 it was explored by order of the emperor Napoleon III, the work being carried out by Adrien Berbrugger and Oscar Maccarthy.

The Jedars

The Jedars (Arabic "walls" or "buildings") is the name given to a number of sepulchral monuments placed on hill-tops. A rectangular or square podium is in each case surmounted by a pyramid. The tombs date from the 5th to the 7th century of the Christian era, and lie in two distinct groups between Tiaret and Frenda. Frenda, which has largely preserved its old Berber character, has numerous dolmens and prehistoric rock sculptures close by.

Tassili n'Ajjer

Tassili n'Ajjer is known in the New Age culture for its Fungoid rock art, the primitive yet elaborate drawings of psychedelic mushrooms that hints on a shamanic consumption of those plants by the native people of this land.

Other sites
Lambessa
Tebessa
Tipasa
Timgad (the Pompeii of Africa)
Thubursicum (Thubursicum): Well-preserved Roman theater
Beni Hammad Fort (contains second oldest minaret in the country)

Recent discoveries
In 2009, when the Place des Martyrs in Algiers was closed to build the subway station, Algerian and French archeologists found a 5th-century (Christian) basilica below layers of concrete.

In November 2018, archeologists in Algeria announced the discovery, on the site of Ain Boucherit near Sétif, of what seems to be stone tools (similar to Oldowans) and cut animal bones dated back to 2.4 million years old. This discovery turned Ain Boucherit into the oldest human site known today, and shook the theory of East Africa being the cradle of humanity.

See also
Prehistory of Central North Africa

References

Archaeology of Algeria
Prehistoric Africa